Mustansiriya Madrasah was a medieval-era scholarly complex that provided a universal system of higher education. It was established in 1227 CE and was named after and built by the Abbasid Caliph al-Mustansir in Baghdad, Iraq. The Madrasa taught many different subjects, including medicine, math, literature, grammar, philosophy, and Islamic religious studies. However, the major focus of education was Islamic law. It became the most prominent and high-ranking center for Islamic studies in all of Baghdad. Madrasas during the Abbasid period were used as the predominant instrument to foster the spread of Sunni thought as well as a way to extend the founder's pious ideals. The architecture of the Madrasa was also an important example of Islamic architectural development in Baghdad. The Madrasa has experienced several periods of decline and reemergence throughout its history. The most significant degradation to the Madrasa's architecture and position within Baghdad was the Mongol Siege of Baghdad (1258). Today, the Madrasa is in a state of restoration as is it being overseen by the Directorate of Antiquities in Iraq. It is currently a part of the Al-Mustansiriya University, and is located on the left bank of the Tigris River. Adjacent landmarks include the Saray souq, the Baghdadi Museum, Mutanabbi Street, the Abbasid Palace, and Caliph's Street.

Education 
Within the school of Islamic studies, there were specific divisions of Islamic knowledge. The divisions included the Dar al-Qur'an and the Dar al-Hadith. The Dar al-Qur’an, or the House of Qur’an, was dedicated to the study and recitation of the Qur’an. There was a designated reciter of the Qur'an and a fellow aid to help teach the students. Along with the students, there were thirty orphans who were housed in the complex. All students, including the orphans, were designated an equal wage, bread, and stew. The Dar al-Hadith was dedicated to the study of the sayings and traditions of the Prophet Muhammad. Within this school, there was a senior scholar, or shaykh, who held the highest position of education within the school.

Additionally, the School of Medicine was housed in the Mustansiriya Madrasa. The School of Medicine was led by a senior Muslim physician who was required to have ten students employed to him. There was also a hospital located in the Madrasa, allowing medical students to learn and practice medicine within the same complex.

Mustansiriya Madrasa included a variety of buildings such as a hammam, public hospital, pharmacy, food storage site, and kitchen. There was also space designated for student residences. The Madrasa provided food, lodging, clothing, and a monthly stipend for its students. Its library had an initial collection of 80,000 volumes, given by the Caliph. The collection was said to have grown to 400,000 volumes, although the reports of both these figures may have been exaggerated. Even though the libraries’ collection survived the Mongol sack of 1258 CE, it was merged with that of Nizamiyah Madrasa in 1393 CE, whose collection had subsequently been dispersed or disappeared. As a result of the Ottoman invasion and capture of Baghdad in 1534 CE, books from the palaces and libraries were taken as the spoils of war and became an important part of the royal library in Istanbul.

Architecture 
The Mustansiriya Madrasa is one of the only buildings still standing that provides evidence for Baghdad's role as a center for Islamic Art and for the city's role in the development of geometric ornaments. The layout of the Madrasa is a basic four-iwan plan fit into a two-story rectangular building with a large courtyard. Each school of Islamic law was designated to a separate corner of the building. Some of the main decorative features includes muqarnas; series of interconnected vaults used to highlight squinch zones of domes or exterior of minarets and domes. The Mustansiriya incorporates arabesque and carved brick decoration in an exterior tripartite facade. The main entrance is made up of three conical archways, star and polygon figures, and an inscription describing the buildings patron, Al-Mustansir. Earlier Umayyad and Abbasid themes of foliage and greenery are also evoked in the exterior facade of the entrance archways. The other entrances are ornately decorated with geometric patterns of zig-zags, square designs, and ornamentation centered around water. The southwestern entrance also includes a later inscription about the Ottoman Sultan Abd al-Aziz. In 1235, an early monumental water-powered alarm clock that announced the appointed hours of prayer and the time both by day and by night was completed in the entrance hall of the Mustansiriya Madrasah in Baghdad.

History 
After the 13th century, the Madrasa experienced a period of decline in prominence, followed by fluctuating centuries of purpose and power. The widespread annihilation and conquest of the Mongols throughout the Middle East resulted in the first stages of transformation for the complex. The Mongol Sack of 1258 devastated parts of the Madrasa that were later restored. After the initial attack, the Mongols settled in Baghdad under the emperors of the Il-Khanids. In 1534, the Ottoman Turks seized control, maintaining a stable reign until the British accession in the early 20th century. During the late 18th to early 20th century, the Mustansiriya Madrasa was used largely for military purposes such as serving as a place of rest and resource as well as a storage house for soldier uniforms. This multipurpose building also became known as the khan al- muwasilah in the 18th century specifically, which served as a caravanserai for traders passing through Baghdad.

Present day 
In 1973, the Mustansiriya Madrasa was overseen by the Directorate of Antiquities in Iraq. Since then, the complex has been in a consistent state of reconstruction. Recently, the modern businesses surrounding the Madrasa have been demolished with the intention of restoring the original perimeters of the complex. As a result of the reconstruction and conservation of this complex, the Mustansiriya Madrasa still plays an important role in Baghdad as the Madrasa is now part of the Al-Mustansiriya University.

References

External links

 https://web.archive.org/web/20070930022328/http://arabworld.nitle.org/texts.php?module_id=12&reading_id=118&sequence=10
 https://web.archive.org/web/20070930033359/http://hnn.us/comments/9850.html
 https://web.archive.org/web/20100702145209/http://www.uomustansiriyah.edu.iq/english_index.html

1233 establishments in Asia
Education in Baghdad
Madrasas in Iraq
Buildings and structures in Baghdad
Baghdad under the Abbasid Caliphate
13th-century madrasas